

People
Mathur (name), a clan of the Kayastha community in north India

Places
 Mattur or Mathur, a village in Karnataka, India
 Mathur-I, a village in Palakkad district, Kerala, India
 Mathur-II, a village in Palakkad district, Kerala, India
 Mathur (gram panchayat), a gram panchayat in Palakkad district, Kerala, India
 Mathur, Chennai, a locality of Chennai, Tamil Nadu, India
 Mathur Aqueduct, an aqueduct in Kanyakumari district, Tamil Nadu, India

See also 

 Mathura (disambiguation)